The Public Order Operational Command Unit (CO11) is a Met Operations unit of London's Metropolitan Police Service, the unit is responsible for a series of specialist policing activities, which include:

 Public order and event policing – including Forward Intelligence Teams
 Public order training
 Emergency procedures
 Contingency planning
 Officer safety policy and training

CO11 supports other operational units and borough command units with advice and guidance, including the training arm of the Mounted Branch. Its numeral recalls its former identity as the Criminal Intelligence Branch, at which time it was numbered SO11.

The unit's subdivisions previously included CO11 (7), the Dog Support Unit (DSU), now part of Met Taskforce (MO7).

References 

Public Order Operational Command Unit